Prince of Thieves '81 is a 1981 role-playing game supplement published by Gamelords for Thieves' Guild.

Contents
Prince of Thieves '81 is three adventure scenarios that were previously used in competition sponsored by Gamelords at several summer game conventions.

Reception
Lewis Pulsipher reviewed Prince of Thieves '81 in The Space Gamer No. 47. Pulsipher commented that "If you liked the earlier Thieves' Guild material you'll like this, and at [the price] it may be one of the better values of the series.  But if you want to try this kind of thing for the first time, get Thieves' Guild I so that you'll understand the rules."

References

Role-playing game supplements introduced in 1981
Thieves' Guild (role-playing game) supplements